Minuet in Hell is a Big Finish Productions audio drama based on the long-running British science fiction television series Doctor Who. Unlike the other Eighth Doctor audio plays from this "season", Minuet in Hell was not broadcast on BBC 7 in 2005, primarily due to story references that were dropped for the broadcasts, and the more mature subject matter of this story.

Plot
The Brigadier finds the Eighth Doctor a patient of a medical institute. Meanwhile, Charley has lost her memory and is working in the Hell Fire Club under the direction of Francis Dashwood the Third, where a demonic creature called Marchosias has been summoned by the local dignitaries of Malebolgia. Are these demons real, or can the disturbed Doctor reclaim his wits and learn the truth?

Cast
The Doctor — Paul McGann
Charley Pollard — India Fisher
Brigadier Lethbridge-Stewart — Nicholas Courtney
Brigham Elisha Dashwood III — Robert Jezek
Dr Dale Pargeter — Maureen Oakley
Gideon Crane — Nicholas Briggs
Becky Lee Kowalczyck — Helen Goldwyn
Senator Waldo Pickering — Morgan Deare
Orderly — Hylton Collins
Guard — Alistair Lock
Scott — Barnaby Edwards

Continuity

In the second part of Minuet in Hell, a litany of the Doctor's previous companions includes the name "Sam". At the time of the play's release, this was intended as a reference to Sam Jones, the Eighth Doctor's companion from the novels; this placed the books and the audios in the same continuity.  Producer Gary Russell subsequently decided that the two continuities should be separate (partly because of different directions taken between the two ranges). The play Terror Firma introduced the characters of Samson and Gemma Griffin, previously unknown companions of the Eighth Doctor, providing the possibility that "Sam" was a reference to Samson instead.
Ramsay the Vortisaur first entered the TARDIS in Storm Warning.

Notes

This audio drama is based on an earlier Audio Visuals story of the same name, which was set in the context of the historical Hellfire Club.  The Big Finish version moves the action to a fictional U.S. state called "Malebolgia", which, despite its name, appears to be somewhere in the Bible Belt. The Audio Visuals version starred Nicholas Briggs as the "Nth Doctor". In the Big Finish version, Briggs plays a character who believes himself to be the Doctor.
Teenaged demon hunter Becky Lee Kowalczyck is an obvious homage to Buffy Summers, heroine of Buffy the Vampire Slayer.

External links
Big Finish Productions - Minuet in Hell

2001 audio plays
Eighth Doctor audio plays
Fiction about amnesia
Fiction set in 2003